Jules Hamidou (born 8 August 1987) is a professional footballer who currently plays as a defender for Delémont. Born in Switzerland, he represented Chad at international level.

Career 

Hamidou plays for Delémont in Switzerland. He played for Laufen and Biel-Bienne, too.

International career 

He is a member of the Chad national football team, where he plays the centre-position. He made a national team debut in 2008 when he came in as a substitute in World Cup qualifying match against Mali, on 11 October 2008. He was called in 2010 too, but the injury prevented him from playing. In 2011, he made his second appearance against Malawi. The match ended 2-2 and disabled Malawi to qualify to 2012 African Cup of Nations. His third match was against Malawi again, he played in a 2-0 defeat in 2013 African Nations Cup qualifiers.

See also
 List of Chad international footballers

References

External links

1987 births
Living people
Chadian footballers
Chad international footballers
Swiss men's footballers
Swiss people of Chadian descent
SR Delémont players
FC Laufen players
FC Biel-Bienne players
People from Delémont
Association football defenders
Sportspeople from the canton of Jura